Darmstadt is an electoral constituency (German: Wahlkreis) represented in the Bundestag. It elects one member via first-past-the-post voting. Under the current constituency numbering system, it is designated as constituency 186. It is located in southern Hesse, comprising the city of Darmstadt and surrounding parts of the Darmstadt-Dieburg district.

Darmstadt was created for the inaugural 1949 federal election. Since 2021, it has been represented by Andreas Larem of the Social Democratic Party (SPD).

Geography
Darmstadt is located in southern Hesse. As of the 2021 federal election, it comprises the independent city of Darmstadt and the municipalities of Alsbach-Hähnlein, Bickenbach, Eppertshausen, Erzhausen, Griesheim, Messel, Modautal, Mühltal, Münster (Hessen), Ober-Ramstadt, Pfungstadt, Roßdorf, Seeheim-Jugenheim, and Weiterstadt from the Darmstadt-Dieburg district.

History
Darmstadt was created in 1949. In the 1949 election, it was Hesse constituency 20 in the numbering system. From 1953 through 1976, it was number 145. From 1980 through 1998, it was number 143. In the 2002 and 2005 elections, it was number 187. Since the 2009 election, it has been number 186.

Originally, the constituency comprised the independent city of Darmstadt and the Landkreis Darmstadt district. In the 1976 through 1998 elections, it acquired a configuration very similar to its current borders, but excluding the municipalities of Eppertshausen and Münster (Hessen) from the Darmstadt-Dieburg district. It acquired its current borders in the 2002 election.

Members
The constituency has been held by the Social Democratic Party (SPD) during all but three Bundestag terms since its creation. It was first represented by Richard Hammer of the Free Democratic Party (FDP) from 1949 to 1953. Ludwig Metzger of the SPD was elected in 1953 and served until 1969. He was succeeded by Günther Metzger from 1969 to 1976, followed by Reinhold Staudt for one term. Helga Timm then represented it from 1980 to 1990. Eike Ebert served a single term from 1990 to 1994. Andreas Storm of the Christian Democratic Union (CDU) won it in 1994 and served until 1998, when Walter Hoffmann regained it for the SPD. Brigitte Zypries was representative from 2005 to 2017. Astrid Mannes of the CDU was elected in 2017. Andreas Larem of the SPD was elected in 2021.

Election results

2021 election

2017 election

2013 election

2009 election

References

Federal electoral districts in Hesse
1949 establishments in West Germany
Constituencies established in 1949
Darmstadt
Darmstadt-Dieburg